Peucedanum angustisectum is a species of flowering plant in the family Apiaceae. It is found in Cameroon and Nigeria. Its natural habitat is subtropical or tropical dry lowland grassland.

References

angustisectum
Flora of Cameroon
Flora of Nigeria
Near threatened plants
Taxonomy articles created by Polbot
Taxobox binomials not recognized by IUCN